Senator Bauer may refer to:

Albert Bauer (1928–2021), Washington State Senate
André Bauer (born 1969), South Carolina State Senate
Carl W. Bauer (1933–2013), Louisiana State Senate
Stanley J. Bauer (1913–1972), New York State Senate